Chionanthus globosus grows as a tree up to  tall, with a trunk diameter of up to . The flowers are white. The specific epithet globosus is from the Latin meaning "spherical", referring to the fruit. The species is endemic to Malaysian Borneo (Sabah and Sarawak).

References

globosus
Endemic flora of Borneo
Trees of Borneo
Plants described in 1980